Catherine Annette Hanshaw (October 18, 1901 – March 13, 1985) was an American Jazz Age singer. She was one of the most popular radio stars of the late 1920s and early 1930s. Over four million of her records had been sold by 1934.

In her ten-year recording career, she recorded about 250 sides. In a 1934 poll conducted by Radio Stars magazine, she received the title of best female popular singer (Bing Crosby was voted the best male popular singer). Second place went to Ethel Shutta, third place went to Ruth Etting, and fourth place went to Kate Smith.

Biography
Catherine Annette Hanshaw was born on October 18, 1901 to Frank Wayne Hanshaw and Mary Gertrude McCoy in their residence in Manhattan. She had two brothers, George and Frank.

Her aunt and uncle, Nellie McCoy and Bob "Uke" Hanshaw, were vaudeville performers. She sang for guests at hotels owned by her father and demoed sheet music at her family's music store, The Melody Shop, in Mount Kisco, Westchester County, New York. Hanshaw aspired to be a portrait painter, studying at the National School of Design for a year. Her professional music career started when she was paid to sing for society and birthday parties.

Before recording Hanshaw sang on local radio stations while visiting Florida with her family. She first recorded a demo for Pathé featuring a medley of popular songs. Her first commercial recordings, "Black Bottom" and "Six Feet of Papa," were recorded on September 12 and 18, 1926. She recorded for Pathé until 1928; Pathé released her records on both the Pathé and the Perfect labels.

Starting in June 1928, she recorded for Columbia; most of these recordings were issued on their dime-store labels Harmony, Diva, Clarion and Velvet Tone. A handful were also released on their regular-priced Columbia and OKeh labels. Although most were released under Hanshaw's name, she was renamed Gay Ellis for sentimental numbers, and Dot Dare or Patsy Young for her Helen Kane impersonations. She recorded under a number of other pseudonyms, including Ethel Bingham, Marion Lee, Janet Shaw and Lelia Sandford.

Starting in August 1932, she began recording for ARC; her recordings were issued on their Melotone, Perfect, Conqueror, Oriole and Romeo labels. Her final session, on February 3, 1934, was placed on ARC's Vocalion label.

Throughout her recording career, she sang with the Original Memphis Five, Willard Robison's Deep River Orchestra, Sam Lanin's Orchestra, Lou Gold's Orchestra, and Rudy Vallée's Connecticut Yankees. Some of the artists whose solos were featured on her recordings were Red Nichols, Miff Mole, Phil Napoleon, Joe Venuti, Eddie Lang, Adrian Rollini, Vic Berton, Benny Goodman, Jimmy Dorsey, Tommy Dorsey, and Jack Teagarden.

Hanshaw began performing on the radio in 1929. In the early 1930s, she sang on the air with Glen Gray's Casa Loma Orchestra. From 1932 to 1934, she was featured on the popular Thursday evening radio program Maxwell House Show Boat. She made her only appearance on film in the 1933 Paramount short Captain Henry's Radio Show. Her music career ended on December 6, 1937, after a performance on The Chevrolet Musical Moments Revue.

Hanshaw's singing style was relaxed and suited to the jazz-influenced pop music of the late 1920s and early 1930s. She combined the voice of an ingenue with the spirit of a flapper. She was known as The Personality Girl, and her trademark was saying "That's all!" in a cheery voice at the end of many of her records. Hanshaw had a low opinion of her voice, and she said was afraid of broadcasting. When asked why, she said, "I'm so afraid I'll fail, not sing my best. Suppose I should have to cough. Suppose I didn't get just the right pitch. And all those people listening." Hanshaw's favorite singers were Marion Harris, Sophie Tucker, and Blossom Seeley. She also enjoyed her contemporaries, Ethel Waters, and Connee Boswell. She composed two songs, "Sweet One" and "Till Your Happiness Comes Along." Hanshaw disliked show business. In a 1972 interview with Jack Cullen she said,

Hanshaw married Pathé Records executive Herman "Wally" Rose in 1929.

Later years
In 1954, Herman "Wally" Rose died. Annette Hanshaw later married Herb Kurtin.  In 1985, aged 83, she died of cancer in New York City. She had no children.

Legacy
Collections of Hanshaw's recordings were released on CD by Sensation Records in 1999. Another revival of interest occurred in 2008 with the use of Hanshaw's music in the animated film Sita Sings the Blues, which retells the Indian epic poem the Ramayana from Sita's perspective by setting scenes from it to performances by Hanshaw.

For many years it was believed that Hanshaw was born in 1910. The Syncopated Times lists her birthday as October 18, 1901 in New York City. Her nephew, Frank W. Hanshaw III, confirmed that 1901 is the year on her birth certificate, the last two numbers of the year having been transposed, possibly by Hanshaw herself to shave years off her true age.

Charted discography

References

External links

 Annette Hanshaw Biography, jazzage1920s.com
 Annette Hanshaw profile, Find a Grave
 
 Annette Hanshaw recordings at the Discography of American Historical Recordings.
 Annette Hanshaw (1901-1985) at the Red Hot Jazz Archive

1901 births
1985 deaths
American jazz singers
American women jazz singers
Singers from New York City
Deaths from cancer in New York (state)
20th-century American singers
20th-century American women singers
Jazz musicians from New York (state)
Pathé Records artists
Columbia Records artists